Urqumayu (Quechua urqu mountain / male, mayu river, "mountain river" or "male river", hispanicized spelling Orgomayo) or Vizcarra (named after a prefect of Huánuco, Colonel Pedro C. Vizcarra) is a river in the Ancash Region and in the Huánuco Region in Peru. It is a tributary of the Marañón River.

References

External links 

Rivers of Peru
Rivers of Ancash Region
Rivers of Huánuco Region